Disney Universe is a co-operative action-adventure video game developed by Eurocom and published by Disney Interactive Studios. The game was released on Microsoft Windows, PlayStation 3, Wii and Xbox 360 in October 2011 in North America and Europe. It features the ability to suit up as characters from multiple Disney franchises, including Aladdin, The Lion King, Monsters, Inc., WALL-E, Finding Nemo, Pirates of the Caribbean, Phineas and Ferb, Tron: Legacy and The Muppet Show.
The game was made backward-compatible for Xbox One and Series X/S on November 15, 2021.

Gameplay
The game is a 3D platform game similar to the more recent Nicktoons Unite! series games.

Up to four friends can connect through local multiplayer and play through 6 different worlds to defeat enemies, and collect powerups and coins. One unique feature is that the enemies actively try to hinder a player's progress by setting up traps or hiding key items.

The two main attractions of the game are the levels and the costumes. Players travel to 6 worlds from classic and contemporary Disney and Pixar properties, consisting of Alice in Wonderland, Pirates of the Caribbean, The Lion King, WALL-E, Monsters, Inc., and Aladdin. The travellers can acquire 45 costumes based on numerous other Disney franchises, such as The Little Mermaid, Tron, Mickey Mouse, Lilo & Stitch and Finding Nemo.

Character mode
The costumes need to be upgraded by finding stars in the levels. The skill set remains the same for each, but becomes more powerful. Each character has a handheld weapon specific to that character. For example, Aladdin ends up with Genie's lamp at 4 stars, and Sully has a piece of Boo's door.

Development

Downloadable content
Downloadable content has been announced to be a big part of Disney Universe for the PlayStation 3, Wii, and Xbox 360 versions of the game. Through the "Online Shop" featured in the game or the PlayStation Store and Xbox Marketplace, the DLCs featured additional costumes and worlds. The first release featured a Disney Villains Costume Pack. A theme-pack based on The Nightmare Before Christmas, was released near the Christmas season and is the Disney Universe voting poll winner. Theme-packs based on Phineas and Ferb, and The Muppets were released in March 2012.

Re-release
Disney Universe: Ultimate Edition included the original Disney Universe game along with all six downloadable content packs. The extra downloadable content included packs from The Disney Villains, The Nightmare Before Christmas, The Jungle Book, Phineas and Ferb, The Muppets and the Neverland pack.

The Ultimate Edition was released on June 27, 2012 in PAL regions, but not in North America and other NTSC regions.

Reception 

The game received mixed or average reviews on Metacritic, gaining average review scores of 70% for PlayStation 3, 61% for Wii, and 66% for Xbox 360.

See also
List of Disney video games

References

External links
Official U.S. website
Official UK website

2011 video games
Action-adventure games
Crossover video games
Wii games
PlayStation 3 games
Xbox 360 games
Windows games
Disney video games
Multiplayer and single-player video games
Video games developed in the United Kingdom
Eurocom games
Video games scored by Steve Duckworth
3D platform games
Video games scored by Jim Croft
Pirates of the Caribbean video games
Alice in Wonderland (franchise)
Monsters, Inc. video games
WALL-E
The Lion King (franchise) video games
Aladdin (franchise) video games